Bryggman is a surname. Notable people with the surname include:

Erik Bryggman (1891–1955), Finnish architect
Larry Bryggman (born 1938), American actor
Lars Bryggman (born 1993), Swedish ice hockey player